Arunachal Front is an Indian English-language daily newspaper published from Naharlagun, Arunachal Pradesh. News from the state (i.e. Arunachal Pradesh), the country, and the world are covered in this newspaper.

References

External links 
 

English-language newspapers published in India
Itanagar
Publications with year of establishment missing